Golozan (also Romanized as Gol‘oz̄ān, Guliser or Gül’zan) is a village in Zulachay Rural District, in the Central District of Salmas County, West Azerbaijan Province, Iran. At the 2006 census, its population was 657, in 176 families.

References 

Populated places in Salmas County